The Bowes Museum is an art gallery in the town of Barnard Castle, in County Durham in northern England. It was built to designs by Jules Pellechet and John Edward Watson to house the art collection of John Bowes and his wife Joséphine Benoîte Coffin-Chevallier, and opened in 1892.

It contains paintings by El Greco, Francisco Goya, Canaletto, Jean-Honoré Fragonard and François Boucher, together with items of decorative art, ceramics, textiles, tapestries, clocks and costumes, and objects of local historical interest. Some early works of Émile Gallé were commissioned by Coffin-Chevallier. There is an eighteenth-century Silver Swan automaton, which periodically preens itself, looks round and appears to catch and swallow a fish.

History
The Bowes Museum was purpose-built as a public art gallery for John Bowes and his wife Joséphine Benoîte Coffin-Chevallier, Countess of Montalbo, who both died before it opened in 1892. Bowes was the son of John Bowes, the 10th Earl of Strathmore and Kinghorne, although he did not inherit the title as he was deemed illegitimate under Scottish law. His grandmother was Mary Bowes, Countess of Strathmore and Kinghorne.

It was designed with the collaboration of two architects, the French architect Jules Pellechet and John Edward Watson of Newcastle. The building is richly modelled, with large windows, engaged columns, projecting bays, and mansard roofs typical of the French Second Empire, set within landscaped gardens. An account in 1901 described it as "... some 500 feet in length by 50 feet high, and is designed in the French style of the First Empire. Its contents are priceless, consisting of unique Napoleon relics, splendid picture galleries, a collection of old china, not to be matched anywhere else in the world, jewels of incredible beauty and value; and, indeed, a wonderful and rare collection of art objects of every kind."

Among those with less favourable opinions was Nikolaus Pevsner, who considered it to be "... big, bold and incongruous, looking exactly like the town hall of a major provincial town in France. In scale it is just as gloriously inappropriate for the town to which it belongs (and to which it gives some international fame) as in style".

Construction on the building began in 1869; Bowes and his wife left an endowment and 800 paintings.  Their collection of European fine and decorative arts amounted to 15,000 pieces.

A major redevelopment of the Bowes Museum began in 2005. To date, improvements have been made to visitor facilities (shop, cafe and toilets); galleries (new Fashion & Textile gallery, Silver gallery and English Interiors gallery); and study/learning facilities. The three art galleries, on the second floor of the museum, were updated at the same time.

The museum holds temporary exhibitions, and has shown works by Monet, Raphael, Turner, Sisley, Gallé, William Morris, and Toulouse-Lautrec.

The BBC announced in 2013 that a Portrait of Olivia Porter was a previously unknown Anthony van Dyck painting. It had been found in the Bowes Museum storeroom by art historian Dr. Bendor Grosvenor  who had observed it on-line at the Your Paintings web site. The painting itself was covered in layers of varnish and dirt, and had not been renovated. It was originally thought to be a copy, and valued at between £3,000 to £5,000. Christopher Brown, director of the Ashmolean Museum, confirmed it was a van Dyck after it had been restored.

Further reading
 Charles E. Hardy – John Bowes and the Bowes Museum (1970, reprinted 1982) 
 Caroline Chapman – John and Josephine: The Creation of The Bowes Museum (2010)
 Lindsay Macnaughton – Staging and Collecting French History: John and Joséphine Bowes, c.1845-1885 (2021) Durham University PhD Thesis
 Judith Phillips – National Identity, Gender, Social Status and Cultural Aspirations in Mid-Nineteenth Century England and France: Joséphine Bowes (1825-1874), Collector and Museum Creator (2020)
 Simon Spier – Creating The Bowes Museum, c.1858-1917: Private Collecting and the Art Market in the Public Art Museum (2021) University of Leeds PhD Thesis

References

External links

 
 Paintings  from the Bowes Museum on VADS
 Information from the 24 Hour Museum
 The Bowes Museum at Google Cultural Institute

Art museums and galleries in County Durham
Museums in County Durham
Decorative arts museums in England
Second Empire architecture
Grade I listed buildings in County Durham
Former private collections in the United Kingdom
Fashion museums in the United Kingdom
Art museums established in 1892
1892 establishments in England
Barnard Castle